Radyr Hydro Scheme is a 400kW small-scale hydroelectric station located in Radyr, Cardiff, Wales.

The scheme makes use of the large height difference created by Radyr Weir to push water through two ,  Archimedean screw turbines.

The scheme was constructed in 2015 by Dawnus, being designed by Renewables First and operated by Cardiff Council.

Cardiff Council built the scheme to supply renewable electricity as part of a plan to lower carbon emissions in order to help Cardiff become a "one planet city" by 2050.

References

Hydroelectric power stations in Wales